Iglesia de San Andrés (Pola de Allande) is a 16th-century Roman Catholic church located in Pola de Allande in the autonomous community of Asturias, Spain. It is dedicated to Andrew the Apostle.

See also
Asturian art
Catholic Church in Spain

References

Churches in Asturias
16th-century Roman Catholic church buildings in Spain